Connecticut's 11th State Senate district elects one member to the Connecticut State Senate. It encompasses parts of New Haven, West Haven, and North Haven. It is currently represented by Democrat Martin Looney, who has served since 1993.

Recent elections

2018

2016

2014

2012

References

11